Silvio Angelo Pio Oddi (14 November 1910 – 29 June 2001) was an Italian prelate of the Catholic Church who worked in the diplomatic service of the Holy See and in the Roman Curia. He became a cardinal in 1969 and headed the Congregation for the Clergy from 1979 to 1986.

Biography
Silvio Oddi was born in Morfasso, near Piacenza, Italy, on 14 November 1910. He studied at the Collegio Alberoni there from 1926 to 1933 (philosophy, theology and moral). He was ordained a priest on 21 May 1933 in Rome, and continued his studies at the Pontifical University of Saint Thomas Aquinas, Angelicum. He entered the Pontifical Ecclesiastical Academy in 1934 and entered the diplomatic service of the Holy See in 1936. He was assigned to the Apostolic Delegation to Iran until 1939. From that year until 1945 he held a similar post in Syria and Lebanon, then in Egypt (1945–1948), and France (1948–1951).

He became the senior official, chargé d'affaires, of the Apostolic Nunciature to Yugoslavia in 1951. When the Vatican stonewalled the government's attempt to negotiate an agreement and instead Pope Pius XII made the regime's most prominent critic, Archbishop Aloysius Stepinac, a cardinal, the government expelled Oddi on 17 December 1952.

On 30 July 1953, Pope Pius XII named him Titular Bishop of Mesembria and Apostolic Delegate for Palestine, Transjordan and Cyprus. On 27 September of the same year, he received his episcopal ordination from Angelo Giuseppe Roncalli, the future Pope John XXIII.

He was named Apostolic Internuncio to Egypt on 11 January 1957. He was named Nuncio to Belgium and to Luxembourg on 17 May 1962.

He took part in the Second Vatican Council (1962–1965). Pope Paul VI created him a cardinal on 28 April 1969, assigning to him the titular church of Sant'Agata dei Goti. He named him Papal Legate for the Patriarchal Basilica of Saint Francis in Assisi and gave him responsibility for the shrine of Loreto as well. Pope John Paul II named him Prefect of the Congregation for the Clergy on 28 September 1979. He retired at the age of 75 upon the appointment of his successor Antonio Innocenti on 9 January 1986.
In 1989 he attended, as Papal Legate, the funeral of Japanese Emperor Hirohito.

 Spiritual Protector of the Military and Hospitaller Order of Saint Lazarus of Jerusalem (Malta Obedience)
 Cardinal Patron of the Militia Templi, a groups of Catholic knights based in Tuscany.

He died on 29 June 2001 in Cortemaggiore and was buried in the parish church of Morfasso.

References

Additional sources 

1910 births
2001 deaths
20th-century Italian cardinals
Apostolic Nuncios to Belgium
Apostolic Nuncios to Luxembourg
Apostolic Nuncios to Egypt
Participants in the Second Vatican Council
Pontifical Ecclesiastical Academy alumni
Prefects of the Congregation for the Clergy
Cardinals created by Pope Paul VI